The fifth season of the Romanian reality talent show Vocea României premiered on ProTV on December 18, 2015. The hosts and the coaches from the previous season have all returned.

This season brought rule changes. Firstly, during the blind auditions, the coaches' chairs only turned around at the end of the performance if at least one of them had pressed the "I WANT YOU" button. Lastly, in the semi-final, each of the eight contestants engaged in a "crossed duel" with a contestant from another team. The winner of the duel was selected by public vote only. This opened up the possibility of coaches ending up with 0, 1 or 2 contestants in the final.

The season finale aired on December 18, 2015. Teams Tudor and Moga had one finalist each, while Team Smiley had two. Both semi-finalists in Team Loredana had been eliminated. Cristina Bălan, best known as the lead vocalist of the bands Impact and ABCD and mentored by Tudor Chirilă, was declared winner of the season. It was Chirilă's second consecutive victory as a coach.

Pre-selections 

Pre-selections took place in the following cities:

Teams 
Color key

Blind auditions 
The first phase of the competition, the blind auditions, taped July 25–26 and August 3–4, 2015, at the Kentauros Studios, Ștefăneștii de Jos, began airing when the season premiered on September 18, 2015.
Color key

Episode 1 (September 18) 
The first of seven pre-recorded audition episodes aired on Friday, September 18, 2015.

Episode 2 (September 25) 
The second episode aired on September 25, 2015.

Episode 3 (October 2) 
The third episode was aired on October 2, 2015.

Episode 4 (October 9) 
The fourth episode aired on October 9, 2015.

Episode 5 (October 16) 
The fifth episode aired on October 16, 2015.

Episode 6 (October 23) 
The sixth episode was aired on October 23, 2015.

Episode 7 (October 30) 
The seventh and last blind audition episode aired on October 30, 2015.

The battles 
After the blind auditions, each coach had fourteen contestants for the battle rounds, which aired November 6–20, 2015. Coaches began narrowing down the playing field by training the contestants. Each episode featured nine or ten battles consisting of pairings from within each team, and each battle concluding with the respective coach eliminating one of the two contestants. Each coach could steal one losing contestant from another team, thus saving them from elimination.

Color key:

Episode 8 (6 November)
The eighth episode aired on November 6, 2015.

Episode 9 (13 November)
The ninth episode aired on November 13, 2015.

Episode 10 (20 November)
The tenth episode aired on November 20, 2015.

Live shows 
Color key

Live Playoffs (Week 1 & Week 2.1) 
Four contestants from each team competed in each of the Live Playoffs, which aired on Friday, November 27, and Tuesday, December 1, 2015. In either of the two shows, the public vote could save one contestant from each team, the second one being chosen by the coach. The other two contestants were eliminated.

Week 1 (November 27)

Week 2.1 (December 1)

Quarterfinals (Week 2.2) 
All 16 remaining contestants competed in the third live show on Friday, December 4, 2015. Voting proceeded as before, except the show started imposing a limit of 5 votes per phone number.

1 The performance also contained a whistled snippet of "Oarecare", a Smiley song.

Semi-final (Week 3) 
The semi-final aired on Friday, December 11, 2015, and featured four "crossed duels" consisting of pairings of contestants from different teams. Each contestant performed a single song. The outcome of each duel was decided by public vote only. With the elimination of Antonio Fabrizi and Mihai Dragomir Rait, Loredana no longer had any artist remaining on her team.

Final (Week 4) 
The top 4 contestants performed in the grand final on Friday, December 18, 2015. This week, the four finalists performed a solo song, a duet with a well-known musician (or group of musicians) and a duet with their coach. The public vote determined the winner, and that resulted in a victory for Cristina Bălan, Tudor Chirilă's second consecutive victory as a coach.

2 The band of season 4 winner Tiberiu Albu.

Elimination chart 
Color key
Artist info

Result details

Overall

Controversies

Pre-selection bias accusations 
Multiple contestants eliminated in the pre-selection phase accused Loredana Groza of bias toward the students at her private singing school. According to them, Lucia Ciobotaru, one of the teachers at this school, was on the pre-selection judging panel.

Liviu Bazu audition scandal 
Contestant Liviu Bazu, who had sung in well-known Romanian bands, such as FFN, Cromatic and Basorelief, and who had appeared in the first episode of the season, claimed that the coaches had been "influenced and manipulated" by Czech producer Peter Majeský, so that they would not press their buttons during his audition. The two had had an argument a few days before, at the rehearsals, because Majeský was smoking in the studio. Bazu stated that, in the wake of the incident, he had decided to kick up a fuss after his audition, since he was sure that it was going to be unsuccessful. After his audition, Bazu expressed his outrage at the production team, declaring that it "destroyed a legend". The contestant also claimed that the production team had insisted that he should participate and that his audition song had been imposed upon him. There has been no statement from ProTV regarding the incident.

Tincuța Fernea publicity campaign 
Tincuța Fernea, a native of Satu Mare and one of the season 5 semi-finalists, was at the center of a media scandal, in the wake of an aggressive publicity campaign promoting the singer, started by the Satu Mare County Council. Fernea's coach, Tudor Chirilă, disapproved of the campaign on his personal blog, criticizing the political involvement of the council in the show and the fact that the council had spent public funds and used pictures of him without consent. Chirilă also stated that the actions of the authorities of Satu Mare had been very unfair towards the other competitors and advised the viewers not to take the artists' origin or artistic past into consideration when voting. Fernea was saved by the public vote twice: in episodes 12 and 13. The coach considered that Fernea had a poor performance in episode 12, which she made up for in episode 13. The involvement of the Satu Mare County Council spawned negative reactions among some viewers who complained about the abundance of posters advising readers to vote for the artist. ProTV requested the removal of the posters, on the ground that they included the logo of the show and pictures of Tudor Chirilă without consent. The president of the council, Adrian Ștef, stated that he found the intention of supporting the contestant natural. Ștef apologized to ProTV and the other contestants, while denying any underlying political motive to the campaign. He also denied any accusations of bias, mentioning that the Satu Mare County Council had made a similar campaign in 2013, in order to support singer Bogdan Bratiș, who came fourth in the third season of the Romanian version of The X Factor.

Participation of celebrities in the contest 
The participation of Cristina Bălan, the winner of the season and former lead singer of the band Impact, spawned negative reactions among some viewers who considered that the artist had an unfair advantage due to the popularity of the band in Romania in the 2000s. Biu Marquetti, Bogdan Vlădău and Mihai Dragomir had also had various degrees of popularity before participating. Bălan expressed surprise at her own victory and explained that her participation was not against the rules of the contest. She also stated that she saw Vocea României as a chance to restart her music career, after a long period of inactivity.

Ratings

References

External links
 Official Vocea României website è

2015 Romanian television seasons